Roman Hupf (born 4 November 1978) is an Austrian footballer who currently plays for the TSV St. Johann im Pongau.

External links
 
 salzburg.com profile 
 fanreport.com profile 

1978 births
Living people
Austrian footballers
Austrian Football Bundesliga players
FC Red Bull Salzburg players
ASVÖ FC Puch players
TSV St. Johann im Pongau players
Association football defenders